Overthinking with Kat & June is an American comedy series, created by Mackenzie Yeager, that premiered on December 19, 2018, on YouTube Premium. The series stars an ensemble cast featuring Alexia Dox, Tenea Intriago, Sasheer Zamata, Blake Lee, Elizabeth Hinkler, Emily Hinkler, Burl Moseley, Madeleine Byrne, Montana Roesch, Justin Kirk, Kelli Goss, Jessika Van, Aaron Takahashi, Kevin Bigley, Nick Fink, Stephen Ellis, Constance Marie, David L. King, and Amanda Foreman.

On March 25, 2019, YouTube Premium cancelled the series after one season.

Premise
Overthinking with Kat & June is about "the birth of a strange but beautiful female friendship, the hopes, dreams and fears — but mostly fears — of the duo are heard out loud."

Cast and characters

Main

 Alexia Dox as June
 Tenea Intriago as Kat
 Sasheer Zamata as Tiff
 Blake Lee as Barry
 Elizabeth Hinkler as Molly
 Emily Hinkler as Tessa
 Burl Moseley as Bobby
 Madeleine Byrne as Angelica
 Montana Roesch as Eve
 Justin Kirk as David
 Kelli Goss as Candace
 Jessika Van as Astrid
 Aaron Takahashi as Econ
 Kevin Bigley as Kevin
 Nick Fink as Tyler
 Stephen Ellis as Mitch
 Constance Marie as Lucinda Renoir Souza
 David L. King
 Amanda Foreman

Recurring
 Simmi Singh as Claire

Guest
 Heath Cullens as Heath the Frisbee Guy ("The Icebreaker Cometh")
 Motoki Maxted as Max the Frisbee Guy ("The Icebreaker Cometh")
 Jadon Cole as Cody ("The Icebreaker Cometh")
 Jay Tapaoan as Larry ("The Icebreaker Cometh")
 Zedrick Restauro as Tad ("The Icebreaker Cometh")
 Lisa Best as Ally ("Zip, Zap, Zop")
 Alexandra Mesmer as Sheila ("Shell of a Man")
 Mackenzie Yeager as Ren Faire Megan ("Shell of a Man")

Episodes

Production

Development
On June 25, 2018, it was announced that YouTube had given the production, then titled Kat & June Think Stuff!, a series order for a first season consisting of six episodes. The series was created by Mackenzie Yeager who is also set to write for the series and co-showrun it alongside Jen Braeden. Executive producers for the series are set to include Shelley Zimmerman, Shauna Phelan, Yeager, and Braeden. Production companies involved with the series are expected to include AwesomenessTV. On September 20, 2018, it was announced that the series had been retitled Overthinking with Kat & June and that it would premiere in late-2018. On November 30, 2018, it was announced that the series would premiere on December 19, 2018.

Casting
Alongside the initial series announcement, it confirmed that Tenea Intriago, Alexia Dox, Emily Hinkler, Elizabeth Hinkler, Sasheer Zamata, and Justin Kirk would star in the series.

Filming
Principal photography for the series commenced on June 25, 2018, in Los Angeles, California.

Release
On November 30, 2018, the official trailer for the series was released.

Reception
In a positive review, Deciders Josh Sorokach praised the series saying, "Stream it. Absolutely stream it. Overthinking with Kat & June is not only a fresh take on the awkwardness of adult friendship but it’s also a ton of fun. I understand there's no shortage of new content out there, but Overthinking with Kat & June is an absurdly funny comedy not to be missed." In another favorable critique, Metro US Andrew Husband described the series as "an occasionally surreal blend of laugh-out-loud comedy and absolute cringe. From Kat and June's frequent fantasizing about their older landlord David to the former’s attempts to prepare the latter for a first date with the help of the twins Tessa and Molly, Overthinking can sometimes emphasize the "over" in its title. The thing is, it works so beautifully for this show and the kind of comedy it’s trying to accomplish."

References

External links

2010s American comedy television series
2018 American television series debuts
2018 American television series endings
English-language television shows
YouTube Premium original series